Calopteron terminale, the end band net-wing, is a species of net-winged beetle in the family Lycidae. It is found in North America.

Calopteron terminale is distinguished from other members of Calopteron by its "transverse depression across the elytra". It is found in woodlands, particularly in eastern North American deciduous forests, most frequently between July and September. The eggs are deposited on dead and dying trees; after hatching the larvae then prey on small arthropods under the bark.

References

External links

 

Lycidae
Articles created by Qbugbot
Beetles described in 1823